Maarten Albert van Grimbergen (born October 4, 1959 in Eindhoven, North Brabant) is a former field hockey player from the Netherlands, who played a total number of 145 international matches for the Dutch Men's Nation Team, in which he scored 36 goals. The striker made his debut in 1980, and played club hockey for Eindhovense Mixed Hockey Club and HC Klein Zwitserland. Van Grimbergen represented the Netherlands in two Summer Olympics (1984 and 1992).

External links
 
  Dutch Hockey Federation

1959 births
Living people
Dutch male field hockey players
Olympic field hockey players of the Netherlands
Field hockey players at the 1984 Summer Olympics
Field hockey players at the 1992 Summer Olympics
Sportspeople from Eindhoven
HC Klein Zwitserland players
20th-century Dutch people